Jack Schaeffer (born March 19, 1946 in Los Angeles, California) is an American musician. He invented a musical instrument, the Strumbola.

Discography

Royale Monarchs
Whole Lot Of Shakin Going On (1962) (Dell)
Sombrero Stomp  (1962) (Dell)
My Babe   (1964) (Dell)
(Hey) Surfs Up  (1964) (Dell)
Great Balls Of Fire  (1964) (Dell)
Teen Scene  (1964) (Dell)
The Cinnamon Cinder Show   / Bob Eubanks  (1963–65) (TV)
Cinnamon Cinder Show Christmas Special  (1965) (TV)

Collector Compilation LPs and CDs Containing Tracks

At The Rockhouse, vol. 11  (Eagle)
Red Hot Rock 'N' Roll  (Red Hot)
High School Favorites  (Teen)
I Want Rock   (White Label)

Forte' Four

Can't You See I'm Trying  (1966) (Decca)
Don't Let The Sun Shine On Me  (1966) (Decca)
I Don't Wanna Say Goodnight  (1966) (Decca)
The Climb  (1966) (Decca)
Viva Las Vegas, Original Soundtrack  / "The Climb"  (1964) (MGM)
The Cool Ones, Original Soundtrack  (1967) (Warner Bros)

AnExchange

Evening of AnExchange  (1972)
Edmonton International Pop Festival (1974)

The Wackers

Wackering Heights (1971) (Electra) CD Release (2006)
Shredder (1973)  (Electra) CD Release (2006)

Hot House Swing Band

L.A. Confidential, Original Soundtrack  (1997) (Warner Bros)
Hello Palm Springs (1998) (DVD)
Got Rhythm?  (2000) (CD)

Producer/Arranger

The Climb (1966) Songwriter
Marin  (1970) Arranger
Evening of AnExchange  (1972) Arranger
Why Can't I ?  Patty Parsons (1979) Producer & Arranger
Ron Butler and the Saxist; Go Figure !   (1982) Producer & Arranger

Various

Faith of Our Children   (1953–55) (NBC) Eleanor Powell
Dateline: Disneyland  (1955) (ABC) The Phil Moore Band
Dodge "White Hat"    (1962) ( TV commercial) The Phil Moore Band
The Steve Allen Playhouse  (1963) (ABC) The Phil Moore Band
Spartan Choir   (1963)  (KFI Radio)
Spartan Choir  (1963)  (LP)
The People's Lawyer  (1975) (TV)
My Father's Hands   (2003) (CD) Dan Anthony
Watercolor Dreams  (2007) (CD) Dan Anthony

References

External links

Amazon Books for author John Schaeffer

1946 births
Musicians from Los Angeles
American male saxophonists
Songwriters from California
Royale Monarchs members
The Forte' Four members
Love Song (band) members
AnExchange members
Surf musicians
Living people
21st-century American saxophonists
21st-century American male musicians
American male songwriters